In photography, backscatter (also called near-camera reflection) is an optical phenomenon resulting in typically circular artifacts on an image, due to the camera's flash being reflected from  unfocused motes of dust, water droplets, or other particles in the air or water. It is especially common with modern compact and ultra-compact digital cameras.

Caused by the backscatter of light by unfocused particles, these artifacts are also sometimes called orbs, referring to a common paranormal claim. Some appear with trails, suggesting motion.

Cause

Backscatter commonly occurs in low-light scenes when the camera's flash is used. Cases include nighttime and underwater photography, when a bright light source and reflective unfocused particles are near the camera. Light appears much brighter very near the source due to the inverse-square law, which says light intensity is inversely proportional to the square of the distance from the source.

The artifact can result from the backscatter or retroreflection of the light from airborne solid particles, such as dust or pollen, or liquid droplets, especially rain or mist. They can also be caused by foreign material within the camera lens. The image artifacts usually appear as either white or semi-transparent circles, though may also occur with whole or partial color spectra, purple fringing or other chromatic aberration. With rain droplets, an image may capture light passing through the droplet creating a small rainbow effect.

Fujifilm describes the artifacts as a common photographic problem:

In underwater scenes, particles such as sand or planktonic marine life near the lens, invisible to the diver, reflect light from the flash causing the orb artifact in the image. A strobe flash, which distances the flash from the lens, eliminates the artifacts. The effect is also seen on infrared video cameras, where superbright infrared LEDs illuminate microscopic particles very close to the lens. The artifacts are especially common with compact or ultra-compact cameras, where the short distance between the lens and the built-in flash decreases the angle of light reflection toward the lens, directly illuminating the aspect of the particles facing the lens and increasing the camera's ability to capture the light reflected from normally subvisible particles.

Paranormal claims

Some ghost hunters have claimed that orb shaped visual artifacts appearing in photographs are spirits of the dead. Others have claimed that orbs are an unknown sort of being, based partly on perceived intent in the orbs' movements. Such perceptions have been interpreted by Michael Shermer as examples of agenticity. Prominent paranormal investigators such as Joe Nickell have agreed with skeptic-debunkers' assessments that orbs result from natural phenomena like insects, dust, pollen, or water droplets.

See also
 Bokeh
 Digital artifact
 Entoptic phenomenon
 Lens flare
 Rod (optical phenomenon)
 Rolling shutter
 Will-o'-the-wisp

References

External links

Digital photography
Paranormal
Science of photography